Washington Township is a township in Marshall County, Iowa, United States.

History
Washington Township was created in 1859.

References

Townships in Marshall County, Iowa
Townships in Iowa